Daio Powell (9 March 1973) is an English former professional rugby league footballer who played in the 1990s and 2000s.

Background
Powell was born in Leeds, West Riding of Yorkshire, England.

International honours
Daio Powell won caps for Wales while at Bradford Northern 1994(…1998?) 1(4?)-caps + 2-caps (interchange/substitute) 2-tries 8-points.

References

External links
Bitter-sweet trip for Daio
Wales lose vice-captain Cowie
Widow of man hit by rugby player is bitter
Player faces death charge
Daio Powell, the Wakefield Trinity three-quarter…

1973 births
Living people
Bradford Bulls players
English rugby league players
Halifax R.L.F.C. players
Keighley Cougars players
Rugby league centres
Rugby league players from Leeds
Rugby league wingers
Sheffield Eagles (1984) players
Sheffield Eagles players
Wakefield Trinity players
Wales national rugby league team players
Western Reds players